is a Japanese nonprofit organization of listing some of the most beautiful villages and towns in Japan. The association is active on enhancement and protection of Japanese rural heritage, cultural fairs & branding and promotion of regional, national and international cooperation of its member villages and towns.

Overview 

Established in 2005, the Association of The Most Beautiful Villages in Japan (titled as, the most beautiful villages in Japan) is an important player in the enhancement and conservation of Japanese rural heritage.
In line with the other members such as France, Italy, Belgium, of the federation of the Most Beautiful Villages on Earth, Japan has common interests: authenticity, quality and presentation of the heritage as a source of sustainable development and life. 
Activities of the association include managing the rights of the use of the title name "the most beautiful villages in Japan" and its branding, providing common research and study platform to the member towns and villages for development and cooperation, conducting rural crafts show and food fairs for tourism development, annual photo contests and advocating social awareness about the supreme importance of the rural cultural and natural heritage for its conservation for the future generations.

History 
 2005 October  - The mayor of Biei town of Hokkaido prefecture in Japan initiates association, 7 towns joined the initiative.
 2006 February  - Registered to Non-Profit Organization in Japan.
 2006 October  - Kiso town of Nagano Prefecture and Takaharu town of Miyazaki Prefecture join the association.
 2007 October  - Shibetsu town of Hokkaido prefecture and Gero city of Gifu Prefecture join the association.
 2008 October  - Tsurui village, Kyōgoku town of Hokkaido prefecture, Iide town of Yamagata Prefecture,  Nakagawa village, Nagiso town of Nagano Prefecture, Ine town of Kyoto Prefecture, Umaji village of Kōchi Prefecture join the association.
 2009 October  - With new additions of 15 members of towns and villages the total members of the association touches to 33.
 2010 August  - The Association of The Most Beautiful Villages in Japan joins the international federation called - The Most Beautiful Villages on Earth.
 2010 September  - 6 more towns and villages joins the association. This touches the members to 39.
 2011 October  - 5 more towns and villages joins the association. This touches the members to 44.
 2012 October  - 5 more towns and villages joins the association. This touches the members to 49.

List of member villages and towns 

 Biei town Hokkaido prefecture 
 Akaigawa village Hokkaido prefecture
 Shibetsu town Hokkaido prefecture
 Tsurui village Hokkaido prefecture
 Kyōgoku town Hokkaido prefecture
 Kosaka town Akita Prefecture
 Higashinaruse village Akita Prefecture
 Ōkura village Yamagata Prefecture
 Iide town Yamagata Prefecture
 Iitate village Fukushima Prefecture
 Kitashiobara village Fukushima Prefecture
 Shōwa village of Gunma Prefecture
 Isama, Nakanojō town Gunma Prefecture
 Kuni, Nakanojō town Gunma Prefecture
 Hayakawa town Yamanashi Prefecture
 Ōshika village Nagano Prefecture
 Kiso town Nagano Prefecture
 Nagiso town Nagano Prefecture
 Nakagawa village Nagano Prefecture
 Ogawa village Nagano Prefecture
 Takayama village Nagano Prefecture
 Maze, Gero city Gifu Prefecture
 Shirakawa village Gifu Prefecture
 Ine town Kyoto Prefecture
 Ojiro, Kami town Hyōgo Prefecture
 Wazuka, Kyoto Prefecture
 Soni village Nara Prefecture
 Totsukawa village Nara Prefecture
 Shinjō village Okayama Prefecture
 Chizu town Tottori Prefecture
 Kamikatsu town Tokushima Prefecture
 Kamijima town Ehime Prefecture
 Umaji village Kōchi Prefecture
 Hoshino, Yame city Fukuoka Prefecture
 Tōhō village   Fukuoka Prefecture
 Ojika town Nagasaki Prefecture
 Minamioguni town Kumamoto Prefecture
 Tsukahara, Yufu city Ōita Prefecture
 Takaharu town Miyazaki Prefecture
 Aya town Miyazaki Prefecture
 Kikai town Kagoshima Prefecture
 Tarama village Okinawa Prefecture
(as of October 2012)

Some criteria for membership 

 About less than 10,000 population.
 Requires two or more local resources to be classified i.e., landscape, environment and culture.
 Having regional sustainable resources.
 Efforts must be taken for sustainable use of local resources.
 Local resources must be already protected by public means, such as Ordinance.

External links 
 The Most Beautiful Villages in Japan 
 Most Beautiful Villages of France
 The Most Beautiful Villages in Italy
 The Most Beautiful Villages of Wallonia (Belgium)
 Association of The Most Beautiful Villages of Quebec, Canada

Local government in Japan
2005 establishments in Japan
Organizations established in 2005
Lists of most beautiful villages